Pecan is an unincorporated community in Clay County, in the U.S. state of Georgia.

History
A post office called Pecan was established in 1889, and remained in operation until 1906. Pecan is located within a pecan-growing region, hence the name.

References

Unincorporated communities in Clay County, Georgia